The 1997-98 Northern Arizona Lumberjacks men's basketball team represented Northern Arizona University in the 1997-98 NCAA Division I men's basketball season. The Lumberjacks were led by head coach Ben Howland, and played their home games at the Walkup Skydome as members of the Big Sky Conference. After finishing atop the conference regular season standings, Northern Arizona won the Big Sky tournament to receive an automatic bid to the NCAA tournament  the first appearance in school history. As No. 15 seed in the West region, the Lumberjacks lost to No. 2 seed Cincinnati in the opening round, 65–62.

Roster 

Source

Schedule and results

|-
!colspan=12 style=| Non-conference regular season

|-
!colspan=12 style=| Big Sky regular season

|-
!colspan=12 style=| Big Sky tournament

|-
!colspan=12 style=| NCAA tournament

|-

Source

References

Northern Arizona Lumberjacks men's basketball seasons
Northern Arizona Lumberjacks
Northern Arizona
Northern Arizona Lumberjacks men's basketball
Northern Arizona Lumberjacks men's basketball